Frederick or Fred Warner may refer to:
 Frederick Warner (diplomat) (1918–1995), British diplomat and politician
 Frederick Warner (engineer) (1910–2010), British chemical engineer
 Frederick Warner (politician) (1875–1952), Australian politician
 Fred M. Warner (1865–1923), Governor of the U.S. state of Michigan
 Fred Warner (baseball) (1855–1886), American baseball player
 Fred Warner (American football), American football player
 Fred L. Warner (1877–1942), politician in the Michigan House of Representatives